Takeaki Maruyama, better known by his stage name Goth-Trad, is a Japanese dubstep musician. He began composing dubstep in 2005 after being inspired by Wiley's "Morgue". As of 2022, he has released 6 studio albums. His last album New Epoch was released on Mala's Deep Medi label. Goth-Trad also runs an underground music night in Shibuya, Tokyo, called "Back To Chill". He has also experimented with other genres and styles in more recent years.

Discography
2005 - The Inverted Perspective
2005 - Mad Raver’s Dance Floor
2012 - New Epoch
2013 - GOTH-TRAD I
2016 - PSIONICS
2021 - SURVIVAL RESEARCH

References

External links
Official Website

Living people
Japanese record producers
Japanese DJs
Dubstep musicians
Electronic dance music DJs
Year of birth missing (living people)